The 2010 Congressional election for the delegate from Guam's at-large congressional district was held on November 2, 2010.

The non-voting delegate to the United States House of Representatives from Guam is elected for two-year terms. Incumbent Democrat Madeleine Bordallo sought re-election in 2010 and was unopposed in the race.  The election coincided with the 2010 midterm elections.

Primary election
Bordallo was unopposed in the Democratic primary, which was held September 4, 2010.

General election
Bordallo was unopposed in the general election, which was held November 2, 2010.

See also 
United States House of Representatives election in Guam, 2008

References

External links
Office of Governor of Guam

Guam
2010
2010 Guam elections